John Ernest (10 May 1521 – 8 February 1553) was a Duke of Saxe-Coburg.

John Ernest was born in Coburg as the third (but second surviving and the youngest) son of John, Elector of Saxony, and his second wife Margaret of Anhalt-Köthen.

After the death of his father (1532), his half-brother, John Frederick I, became Elector of Saxony. For the first ten years, John Frederick shared the rule (but not the Electoral dignity) with John Ernest. In 1542 John Frederick I decided to rule alone, and ceded the Franconian areas of the Wettin family lands (Coburg and Eisfeld) to John Ernest. However, it was not until Battle of Mühlberg in 1547, in which the elder brother was captured by Emperor Charles V, that John Ernest could govern undisturbed in Coburg.

John Ernest married Catherine, daughter of Philip I, Duke of Brunswick-Grubenhagen, but the marriage was childless. After his death in Coburg, the city fell for a few months to John Frederick — released from the imperial detention — before his death, and then, to his three sons, which governed the Ernestine lands together from 1554 for some years.

References

1521 births
1553 deaths
John Ernest
People from Coburg
Saxon princes